Cat in Repose, also known as Seated Cat, is a stone sculpture composed of Indiana Limestone, located on the Transit Mall of downtown Portland, Oregon, United States. Designed and created by Kathleen McCullough in 1977, the sculpture is currently installed near the intersection of Southwest Fifth Avenue and Southwest Morrison Street. Cat in Repose is part of the City of Portland and Multnomah County Public Art Collection courtesy of the Regional Arts & Culture Council.

Description

Cat in Repose is a stone sculpture composed of Indiana Limestone, created by Kathleen McCullough  in 1977. McCullough also sculpted Limestone Lion (1983), a similar stone work donated by CitiCorp to the Lincoln Park Zoo in memory of A. Rush Watkins, the Chicago businessman who helped establish the Lincoln Park Zoological Society and later served as its president. Both works, depicting reclining felines, are considered interactive art for providing surfaces on which to lean or climb.

The sculpture measures . According to the Regional Arts & Culture Council, the sculpture is "one of the most celebrated sculptures along the Portland Transit Mall and is especially dear to children".

See also

 1977 in art
 Cats in the United States
 Cultural depictions of cats

References

External links
 Travel Portland: "A Guide to Portland Public Art" (PDF)
 TriMet MAX Green Line Public Art Guide (PDF), pages 2, 33–34

1977 establishments in Oregon
1977 sculptures
Animal sculptures in Oregon
Cats in art
Limestone sculptures in Oregon
Limestone statues in the United States
Outdoor sculptures in Portland, Oregon
Sculptures on the MAX Green Line
Southwest Portland, Oregon
Statues in Portland, Oregon